, also known as  was a Ryukyuan gusuku on Okinawa Island. In the Chibana district of Okinawa City, the castle site sits on a hill and is surrounded by jungle.

History
Chibana Castle was in use during the reign of the First Shō Dynasty and served as the residence of the Aji of Goeku Magiri. The castle and Goeku Magiri was given to the Ryukyuan general Uni-Ufugusuku by King Shō Taikyū in return for defeating the Aji of Katsuren Castle, Amawari. After the fall of the First Shō Dynasty, Uni-Ufugusuku was expelled from the castle and later committed suicide. His tomb, and that of his wife, was built at the bottom of the hill that Chibana Castle is atop.

In the early 1960s, a structure was built on top of the hill to commemorate the castle and serve as a tourist attraction, from which all of the former Goeku Magiri can be seen.

References

Castles in Okinawa Prefecture